Laurence or Lawrence Washington may refer to:

Laurence Washington (MP for Maidstone) (1546–1619), Member of Parliament (MP) for Maidstone
Lawrence Washington (1622–1662), MP for Malmesbury
Lawrence Washington (1565–1616), Mayor of Northampton, great-great-great-grandfather of George Washington
Lawrence Washington (1602–1653), great-great-grandfather of George Washington
Lawrence Washington (1659–1698), grandfather of George Washington
Lawrence Washington (1718–1752), George Washington's half-brother and mentor
Lawrence Augustine Washington (1774–1824), nephew of George Washington
Lawrence Berry Washington (1811–1856), great-grandnephew of George Washington
Lawrence C. Washington (born 1951), American mathematician

See also
W. H. Lawrence (industrialist) (Washington Herbert Lawrence, 1840–1900), American industrialist
Lawrence, Washington, a community in the United States